Pierre André Prévost de La Prévostière was the Governor General of Pondicherry. During his time in office, France's main interests were more commercial than political. No significant events occurred during his tenure. Significant development started when his successor, Pierre Christoph Le Noir came into office.

References

French colonial governors and administrators
Governors of French India
Year of death unknown
Year of birth unknown